Tolga Altıntaş (born January 14, 1980 in Turkey) is a Turkish volleyball player. He is 196 cm and plays as outside hitter. He plays for Galatasaray

References

1980 births
Living people
Turkish men's volleyball players
Galatasaray S.K. (men's volleyball) players
21st-century Turkish people